Bulevardul Unirii (Union Boulevard) is a major thoroughfare in central Bucharest, Romania. It connects Constitution Square (Piața Constituției) with Alba Iulia Square (Piața Alba Iulia), and also runs through Union Square (Piața Unirii). The Constitution Square end features the Palace of the Parliament, which began construction simultaneously with the boulevard as an architectural unit.

History
Following the 1977 Vrancea earthquake, Bucharest's city center suffered significant damage, and a large number of historic buildings were demolished to make way for the new Centrul Civic (Civic Center). As part of the project, Bulevardul Unirii was to be Communist Romania's answer to Paris's Avenue des Champs-Élysées. Construction began on June 25, 1984. Initially called Bulevardul Victoria Socialismului (Victory of Socialism Boulevard), the road is lined with apartment blocks and various public buildings of socialist-realism inspiration.

Transport
The boulevard is served by Piața Unirii metro station at Union Square.

Gallery

See also
Systematization
Ceaușima

References

Streets in Bucharest